Archbishop Marian Przykucki (27 January  1924 – 16 October 2009) was the Polish Roman Catholic Metropolitan Archbishop of Szczecin-Kamień from 1992 until May 1, 1999.

Background
Born in Skoki in 1924, Marian Przykucki was ordained a parish priest on 19 February 1950, aged 26, in Poznań, Poland.

On 12 December 1973, aged 49, he was appointed as Auxiliary Bishop of Poznań. On 3 February 1974 he was ordained as  Titular Bishop of Glenndálocha. On 15 June 1981 he was appointed as Bishop of Roman Catholic Diocese of Chełmno (Culm) in which Kashubians live. He took care for the usage of Kashubian language in liturgy.

On 25 March 1992, aged 68, he was appointed Archbishop of Szczecin-Kamień, Poland. He retired on 1 May 1999.

Death
Archbishop Emeritus Przykucki died on 16 October 2009, aged 85.

External links and References
Catholic Hierarchy: Archbishop Marian Przykucki 
Zmarł Ksiądz Arcybiskup Senior Marian Przykucki (Polish)

1924 births
2009 deaths
20th-century Roman Catholic archbishops in Poland
Clergy from Poznań
Clergy from Szczecin
Commanders Crosses of the Order of Merit of the Federal Republic of Germany
Titular bishops of Glendalough